Karel Mallants (born 4 November 1935) is a retired Belgian football midfielder.

References

1935 births
Living people
Belgian footballers
Standard Liège players
RFC Liège players
Belgian Pro League players
Belgium international footballers
Association football midfielders